Henri Célestin Delmer (15 February 1907 – 2 March 1996) was a French footballer who played as a midfielder.

During his club career, he played for Amiens AC, Excelsior AC Roubaix and Red Star FC 93. He earned 11 caps for the France national team, and took part in the first two editions of the World Cup in 1930 and 1934.

References

External links
 
 

1907 births
1996 deaths
People from Villejuif
Footballers from Val-de-Marne
French footballers
France international footballers
1930 FIFA World Cup players
1934 FIFA World Cup players
FC Mulhouse players
Excelsior AC (France) players
Amiens SC players
Red Star F.C. players
Ligue 1 players
Ligue 2 players
Association football midfielders